Obernau is a suburban district of Rottenburg am Neckar in the administrative district of Tübingen in Baden-Württemberg (Germany).

Geography

Obernau is located 6 km (4.35 mi) western from Rottenburg am Neckar in the Neckar valley. The elevation of the territory is 351 to 498 m.

Extent

The area of the district is 378 hectares. Thereof fall 54.2% upon agriculturally used area, 34.7% upon forest area, 7.9% upon settlement area and roads, 1.9% upon water expanse and 1.3% upon other.

Neighbour localities

The territories of the following villages adjoin to Obernau, they are called clockwise beginning in the north: Nellingsheim, Bad Niedernau, Schwalldorf and Bieringen. (All villages are in the admin. district of Tübingen).

Population

Obernau has a population of 503 people (31/01/08) and is therefore the second smallest district of Rottenburg. At an area of 3.78 km² (2.2 sq mi) this corresponds to a population density of 133 people per km², or 345 per sq mi.

Faiths

The population of the village is predominantly Roman Catholic.

References

External links
 Official Webpage (German)

Rottenburg am Neckar